Mecidiye (former Köseatlı) is a village in Keşan district of Edirne Province, Turkey. Mecidye is close to Gulf of Saros (Aegean Sea). The population of Mecidiye was 870  as of 2013. The settlement was founded by the Muslim refugees of the Russo-Turkish War (1877-1878). Before the 2013 reorganisation, it was a town (belde). Major economic activities of the town are fishing, beekeeping and farming. Tourism is also promising.

References

Villages in Keşan District